Tyrosine hydroxylase deficiency (THD) is a disorder caused by disfunction of tyrosine hydroxylase, an enzyme involved in the biosynthesis of dopamine. This condition is one of the causes of dopa-responsive dystonia.

Symptoms
Patients present with symptoms reflecting the decreased production of dopamine: hypokinetic-rigid syndrome, dystonia, complex encephalopathy. Symptom severity and age at onset are highly variable. A review published on GeneReviews and last updated in 2017 suggests the approximate subdivision of patients into three groups based on differences in severity of symptoms, nature of symptoms, and age at onset. A review published more recently, in 2021, suggests that the disease may have a more gradual and overlapping spectrum, and categorization may be imprecise.

According to the classification on GeneReviews, three approximate phenotypes could be discerned: 
 1. TH-deficient dopa-responsive dystonia - the mildest phenotype with onset between 1 and 12 years of age, with its initial symptoms being lower-limb dystonia and/or difficulty in walking. Symptoms may gradually worsen over the day and become less pronounced after a period of rest. 
 2. TH-deficient infantile parkinsonism with motor delay - the intermediate phenotype, with onset between 3 and 12 months of age. Development of motor skills is visibly delayed, and trunkal hypotonia and parkinsonism are present. 
 3. TH-deficient progressive infantile encephalopathy - the most severe phenotype, with onset recognisable at the fetal stage of development. There is pronounced delay of motor development, truncal hypotonia, marked hypokinesia, limb hypertonia, hyperreflexia, oculogyric crises, ptosis, intellectual disability, and paroxysmal periods of lethargy (with increased sweating and drooling) alternating with irritability.

Diagnosis
In order to diagnose tyrosine hydroxylase deficiency, a sample of the patient's cerebrospinal fluid may be obtained to assess neurotransmitter metabolites that may be affected, as illustrated by the metabolic links in Figure 1. Patients typically have normal levels of 5-hydroxyindolacetic acid (5HIAA), low levels of homovanillic acid (HVA) and 3-methoxy-4-hydroxyphenylethylene glycol (MHPG), and a low HVA:5-HIAA ratio. Upon finding a pattern of CSF abrormalities suggestive of the disease, the diagnosis may be confirmed by analysing the TH gene encoding the enzyme.

According to a review of dopa-responsive dystonias published in 2021, tyrosine hydroxylase deficiency may be hard to diagnose, with a median diagnostic delay of 4 years, and misdiagnosis happens in a significant proportion of patients, with cerebral palsy being the most common erroneous diagnosis.

Treatment
Patients with tyrosine hydroxylase deficiency are treated with L-dopa in conjunction with decarboxylase inhibitors. A significant percentage of patients do not achieve a complete response on this regimen.

History
The first case reports of "Segawa syndrome" and parkinsonism caused by mutations in the tyrosine hydroxylase gene were published in 1995 and 1996.

Alternative names
 Autosomal recessive Segawa syndrome (autosomal dominant Segawa syndrome affects a different gene, GCH1)
 DYT/PARK-TH - designation in accordance with the Nomenclature of Genetic Movement Disorders maintained by the International Parkinson and Movement Disorder Society
 Dopa-responsive dystonia 5b, DYT5b

Figures

External links
Segawa syndrome, autosomal recessive- description in the OMIM compendium.

References

Autosomal recessive disorders
Congenital disorders
Dystonia